Anne Ruwet (born September 22, 1950) is an American politician who served in the Connecticut House of Representatives from the 65th district from 2003 to 2009.

References

1950 births
Living people
Republican Party members of the Connecticut House of Representatives
Women state legislators in Connecticut
People from Torrington, Connecticut
21st-century American politicians
21st-century American women politicians